The 2014 I-League 2nd Division Final Round is the seventh final round of the I-League 2nd Division. The tournament began after the group stage was completed on 18 February 2014. Royal Wahingdoh F.C. won the tournament and will be promoted to 2014–15 I-League.

Format
United Sikkim are given direct entry to the final around, as they were relegated from 2012–13 I-League. Royal Wahingdoh F.C. and Kalighat Milan Sangha F.C. qualified from Group A and Bhawanipore F.C. and Hindustan F.C. qualified from group B.

Fixtures and results

First Leg

Second Leg

Goalscorers

8 goals:
  Daniel Bedemi (Bhawanipore)

5 goals:
  Badmus Babatunde (Royal Wahingdoh)

3 goals:

  Bekay Bewar (Royal Wahingdoh)
  James Gbilee (Kalighat MS)
  Oluwaunmi Somide (United Sikkim)

2 goals:

  Dipendu Dowary (Bhawanipore) 
  Jackichand Singh (Royal Wahingdoh) 
  Mayal Dok Lepcha (United Sikkim)
  Mayel Lepcha (Hindustan)
  Pradeep Mohanraj (Bhawanipore) 

1 goal:

  Abinash Ruidas (Bhawanipore) 
  Alex Petroman da Silveira (Bhawanipore) 
  Arijit Bagui (Kalighat MS)
  Bhim Onrao (Kalighat MS)
  Deepak Mehra (Hindustan)
  Eze Kinglsey (Kalighat MS)
  James Lukram Singh (United Sikkim)
  Jeh Williamson (United Sikkim)
  Joel Sunday (Kalighat MS)
  Joshua Adewumi (Hindustan)
  Khemson Kabui (Hindustan)
  O. O. Sola (Hindustan)
  Phaoom Biswas (Kalighat MS)
  Reagan Singh (Royal Wahingdoh)
  Satiyasen Singh (Royal Wahingdoh)
  Shahensha Ansari (United Sikkim)
  Snehashish Dutta (Bhawanipore) 
  Sukhwinder Singh (United Sikkim)
  Zodinliana (Kalighat MS)

References

External links
Official website

I-League 2nd Division final rounds
I-League 2nd Division
I-League 2nd Division